Thurcroft is a civil parish in the Metropolitan Borough of Rotherham, South Yorkshire, England. The parish contains 17 listed buildings that are recorded in the National Heritage List for England. Of these, one is listed at Grade II*, the middle of the three grades, and the others are at Grade II, the lowest grade. The parish contains the villages of Thurcroft and Brampton-en-le-Morthen and the surrounding area. The most important building in the parish is Thurcroft Hall, a country house, which is listed together with two associated structures. The other listed buildings consist of houses, cottages and associated structures, farmhouses and farm buildings, and a telephone kiosk.


Key

Buildings

References

Citations

Sources

Lists of listed buildings in South Yorkshire
Buildings and structures in the Metropolitan Borough of Rotherham
Thurcroft